2012 Turkish Super Cup (Turkish: TFF Süper Kupa) was the 39th edition of the Turkish Super Cup since its establishment as Presidential Cup in 1966. The match was contested between the 2011–12 Süper Lig champions Galatasaray and the 2011–12 Turkish Cup winners Fenerbahçe, making the game the 372nd edition of Kıtalar Arası Derbi. The game was the first to take place since 2010 Turkish Super Cup, as 2011 Turkish Super Cup was cancelled because of 2011 Turkish sports corruption scandal.

Background
This was the 4th overall national super cup matchup between the teams since 1966, and the first matchup since 2006, when the cup was rebranded as TFF Süper Kupa. Galatasaray last won the cup in 2008 against Kayserispor, while Fenerbahçe last won the cup in 2009 against Beşiktaş. In their three previous finals, Fenerbahçe won two, in 1973 and 1985, while Galatasaray only won in 1996.

Path to the final
Galatasaray were champions in the regular season, finishing 9 points ahead of Fenerbahçe. In the championship playoffs, Fenerbahçe caught up with Galatasaray, but Galatasaray were crowned eventual champions, finishing 1 point ahead of their rivals Fenerbahçe. In the regular season, Galatasaray collected 77 points with 23 wins, 8 draws, and 3 losses. They were trailed by Fenerbahçe, who collected 68 points with 20 wins, 8 draws, and 6 losses. At the beginning of the championship playoffs, the regular season points were halved. Galatasaray finished collecting 48 points by 2 wins, 3 draws, and 1 loss. Fenerbahçe had a better run in the playoffs, by 4 wins, 1 draw, and 1 loss. But they only collected 47 points and Galatasaray became champions of 2011–12 Süper Lig, securing a berth in the Turkish Super Cup final.

Although runners-up of the league, Fenerbahçe performed better in the domestic cup. They entered the tournament at the third round. They won their third-round match against Konya Torku Şekerspor. In the fourth round, they beat Samsunspor. The quarter-final was the toughest match for Fenerbahçe, as they struggled against Kayserispor, but were winners after a penalty shoot-out. In the semi-finals stage, they played against Karabükspor. In the 2012 Turkish Cup Final they were crowned champions against rivals Bursaspor by a decisive 4–0 win, which was their first domestic cup win in 29 years, since 1983. By winning the cup, Fenerbahçe secured a berth in the Turkish Super Cup final.

Match details

See also
 2011–12 Süper Lig
 2011–12 Turkish Cup

References

2012
Super Cup
Super Cup 2012
Galatasaray S.K. (football) matches